Donald Alexander Tytler  (2 May 1925 – 1992) was the 8th  Bishop of Middleton.

A noted liberal, he was born in 1925 and educated at Eastbourne College and  Christ's College, Cambridge; theological training at Ridley Hall, Cambridge. Ordained in 1949 to assistant curacy in Yardley, Birmingham; SCM  Chaplain, University of Birmingham, 1952; Precentor at Birmingham Cathedral, 1955; Diocescan Director of Education within the Diocese of Birmingham, 1957; Vicar of St Mark, Londonderry, and Rural dean of Warley, 1963; Canon Residentiary, Birmingham Cathedral, 1972; and Archdeacon of Aston, 1977; Suffragan Bishop of Middleton, 1982, held until his death in 1992.

Notes

1925 births
People educated at Eastbourne College
Alumni of Christ's College, Cambridge
Archdeacons of Aston
Bishops of Middleton
1992 deaths
20th-century Church of England bishops